A mesa is an elevated area of land with a flat top, surrounded on all sides by steep cliffs.

Mesa or MESA may also refer to:

Geography

Mozambique
 Mesa, Mozambique, a town in Cabo Delgado province

Spain 
 Mesa (river), in the Sierra de Solorio range area

United States
 Mesa, Arizona, a city in Maricopa County
 Mesa, California, a census-designated place in Inyo County
 Mesa County, Colorado
 Mesa, Colorado, an unincorporated town
 Mesa, Idaho
 Mesa, Washington, a city in Franklin County

People
 Mesa (surname)
 Mesha (Hebrew: Mēša‘), Moabite king of the 9th century BC

Science and medicine 
 Malaria Eradication Scientific Alliance
 Mathematics, Engineering, Science Achievement, an academic preparation program
 Maximum entropy spectral estimation, spectral density estimation method
 Methyl salicylate, chemical compound
 Multi-Ethnic Study of Atherosclerosis

Technology 
 Mesa (programming language)
 Mesa (computer graphics), an open-source software implementation of the OpenGL, Vulkan and other specifications
 MESA (seismic survey design software)
 Manufacturing Enterprise Solutions Association, an international association of manufacturing execution systems companies
 Mesa Boogie, also known as Mesa Engineering, an American manufacturer of guitar amplifiers
 MESA Imaging, a Swiss time-of-flight camera manufacturer
 Project MESA, a telecommunications standards collaboration
 Multi-role Electronically Scanned Array, a surveillance radar system
 Modular Equipment Stowage Assembly, a component of the Apollo Lunar Module

Transport
 Mesa Air Group, an American commercial aviation holding company
 Mesa Airlines, an American regional airline

Other uses 
 Meṣa, a solar month in the traditional Indian calendar, and a symbol in Hindu astrology
 Mesa (horse)
 Middle East Studies Association of North America
 Młoda Ekstraklasa, a Polish youth football league
 Mesa, a chain of restaurants in the United States and the Bahamas owned by chef Bobby Flay
 Mesa, home to the loose-knit community in the documentary Off the Grid: Life on the Mesa

See also
 La Mesa (disambiguation)
 Mesa transistor